Ernestas is a Lithuanian masculine given name. Individuals with the name Ernestas include:
Ernestas Ežerskis (born 1987), Lithuanian basketball player
Ernestas Galvanauskas (1882–1967), Lithuanian engineer, politician, former Prime Minister of Lithuania
Ernestas Šetkus (born 1985), Lithuanian footballer
Ernestas Veliulis (born 1992), Lithuanian footballer

References

Lithuanian masculine given names